Concord Township may refer to one of the following places in the State of Illinois:

Concord Township, Adams County, Illinois
Concord Township, Bureau County, Illinois
Concord Township, Iroquois County, Illinois

See also

Concord Township (disambiguation)

Illinois township disambiguation pages